Telamoptilia is a genus of moths in the family Gracillariidae.

Etymology
The name is derived from the Greek telamon (belt) and ptilia (small wing).

Species
Telamoptilia cathedraea (Meyrick, 1908)
Telamoptilia geyeri (Vári, 1961)
Telamoptilia grewiae Liu T, Wang S & Li H, 2015
Telamoptilia hemistacta (Meyrick, 1924)
Telamoptilia prosacta (Meyrick, 1918)
Telamoptilia tiliae Kumata & Ermolaev, 1988

References

External links
De Prins, J. & De Prins, W. 2014. Global Taxonomic Database of Gracillariidae (Lepidoptera). World Wide Web electronic publication (http://www.gracillariidae.net) (30-Apr-2015)

Acrocercopinae
Gracillarioidea genera